Anne Willan (born 26 January 1938 in Newcastle upon Tyne, England) is the founder of the École de Cuisine La Varenne, which operated in Paris and Burgundy France, from 1975 until 2007. La Varenne classes continued in Santa Monica, California, through 2017.

Willan is a recognised authority on French cooking and has more than 50 years of experience as a teacher, author and culinary historian. In May 2013, Willan was inducted into the James Beard Foundation Hall of Fame for her “body of work.” In July 2014, Willan was awarded the rank of Chevalier in the French Legion of Honor for her accomplishments in promoting the gastronomy of France.

She has written more than 30 books, including the influential La Varenne Pratique and the 17-volume, photo-illustrated Look and Cook series which was turned into a 26-part PBS program. Willan's The Country Cooking of France received two 2008 James Beard Foundation book awards for best international cookbook and best cookbook photography.  Bon Appétit magazine named Willan its cooking teacher of the year in 2000.  She was honored with a lifetime achievement award by the International Association of Culinary Professionals (IACP) in 1999 for her contributions to the world of food writing, culinary education and to the IACP itself.

Willan received her master's degree in economics from Cambridge University, then studied and taught cooking in London and Paris before moving to the United States where she became an associate editor of Gourmet magazine and food editor of the Washington Star.  In 1975, she moved to Paris and founded l'Ecole de Cuisine La Varenne, which later expanded to offer programs at The Greenbrier and at her home in Burgundy, the Château du Fëy. The Burgundy campus was in operation until 2007. Most of her books have been widely published in the United States and the UK and have been translated into more than 24 languages.

Willan was married to Mark Cherniavsky, an executive with the World Bank, who died in 2017. They have two children, Emma and Simon, and five grandchildren. As of 2017, Willan lives in London and France.

Bibliography 
 Edible Monument: The Art of Food for Festivals,  Contributor (2015)
 Secrets from the La Varenne Kitchen (2014)
 One Soufflé at a Time: A Memoir of Food and France  (2013)
 The Cookbook Library: Four Centuries of the Cooks, Writers, and Recipes That Made the Modern Cookbook (2012)
 The Country Cooking of France  (2007)
 A Cook’s Book of Quick Fixes & Kitchen Tips  (2005)
 The Good Cook (2004)
 Good Food No Fuss (2003)
 Cooking with Wine (2001)
 From My Château Kitchen (2000)
 In and Out of the Kitchen in Fifteen Minutes or Less (1995)
 Cook It Right (1998)
 Look and Cook, 17 Volume Series, (1992–1995)
 La Varenne Pratique (1989) - also in e-book
 French Regional Cooking (1981)
 Grand Diplome Cooking Course (1979)
 Great Cooks and Their Recipes (1977, republished 1992)

Board memberships 
 Member of the Advisory Council of the Julia Child Foundation 
 Former president of International Association of Culinary Professionals
 Honorary trustee of The IACP Culinary Trust

Awards 
 Appointed "Chevalier" of the French Legion of Honor, 2014
 James Beard Hall of Fame for "Body of Work," 2013
 Won two James Beard Foundation Awards for Country Cooking of France, 2008
 Bon Appetit Cooking Teacher of the Year Award, 2000
 Lifetime Achievement Award of International Association of Culinary Professionals, 1999
 Inducted into Hall of Fame at Australia's World Food Media ceremonies, 1999
 Honored in 1995 as Grande Dame of Les Dames d'Escoffier International, 1995
 Elected to the Who's Who of Food and Beverage in America in 1986

References

External links 
 LaVarenne.com bio
 Epicurious.com Feature page

1938 births
Living people
British food writers
Women food writers
Women cookbook writers
English chefs
Women chefs
James Beard Foundation Award winners